The Kingdom of Palpa was a petty kingdom in the confederation of 24 states known as Chaubisi Rajya. Palpa became part of the Kingdom of Nepal after Prime Minister Bhimsen Thapa ordered the beheading of Prithivipal Sen, King of Palpa.

History 
Kingdom of Palpa was one of the most powerful kingdom in the Chaubisi rajya. It was also much bigger before Argha, Khanchi, and Gulmi seceded to become independent kingdoms.

Branches of the Sena dynasty that ruled Palpa also ruled Makawanpur and Tanahun. The Makawanpur branch further divided and created the kingdoms of Chaudandi and Vijayapur. The Chaudandi kindom contained the present day Madhesh Province, and south-eastern regions of Bagmati Province. The Vijayapur kindom contained the present day Province No. 1.

References 

Chaubisi Rajya
Palpa
Palpa
History of Nepal
Palpa